The 2002 NBA draft was held on June 26, 2002, at The Theater at Madison Square Garden. In this draft, National Basketball Association (NBA) teams took turns selecting 57 amateur college basketball players and other first-time eligible players, such as players from non-North American leagues. This was the last draft that was broadcast on TNT, as ESPN secured rights to air the 2003 draft. The NBA announced that about 42 college and high school players, and five international players, had filed as early-entry candidates for the draft. The Chicago Bulls and the Golden State Warriors each had a 22.5% chance of acquiring the first pick, but the Houston Rockets, with just an 8.9% probability, won the NBA draft lottery on May 19. The Bulls and Warriors were second and third, respectively. As punishment for salary-cap violations during the 2000–01 season, the Minnesota Timberwolves forfeited their first-round draft pick.

The 2002 draft set a record of 17 international selections, with six of them coming in the first round.

Two months after the conclusion of his rookie season, number-two pick Jay Williams nearly lost his life in a motorcycle crash that shattered his pelvis, severed a main nerve in his leg and tore three ligaments in his left knee, including his ACL. Despite intense rehabilitation, Williams never played a game in the NBA again. When it became clear Williams could not return to the Bulls because of his injuries, the team waived him. The Bulls could have voided Williams' contract because it prohibited riding a motorcycle. However, the franchise bought out his contract for $3 million in 2004 instead of having him walk away with nothing.

The draft class was relatively weak outside of the top prospects. Several players selected early had promising careers that ended prematurely due to injury, including Yao Ming, Williams and Dajuan Wagner. Nevertheless, Yao was named a Hall of Famer—a selection predicated as much on his role in popularizing basketball in China as it was for his on-court play. Udonis Haslem is the last remaining active player from the 2002 class, though he went undrafted.

Nine of the players selected in this draft never played in an NBA game throughout their professional basketball careers. Three of those players were the sole selection of the draft from their respective teams: Peter Fehse (Seattle's only pick), Marcus Taylor (Minnesota's only pick) and Mladen Šekularac (Dallas' only pick).

Draft selections

Notable undrafted players
These eligible players were not selected in this draft but played at least one game in the NBA.

Early entrants

College underclassmen
The following college basketball players successfully applied for early draft entrance.

  Lee Benson – F, Brown Mackie (freshman)
  Rodney Bias – F, Alabama (sophomore)
  Cordell Billups – G, Pierce (Washington (sophomore)
  Carlos Boozer – F, Duke (junior)
  Curtis Borchardt – C, Stanford (junior)
  Caron Butler – F, Connecticut (sophomore)
  Mike Dunleavy Jr. – F, Duke (junior)
  Drew Gooden – F, Kansas (junior)
  Rod Grizzard – G, Alabama (junior)
  Marcus Haislip – F, Tennessee (junior)
  Rashid Hardwick – C, Eastern Oklahoma State (freshman)
  Adam Harrington – G, Auburn (junior)
  Casey Jacobsen – G, Stanford (junior)
  Chris Jefferies – F, Fresno State (junior)
  Jared Jeffries – F, Indiana (sophomore)
  Muhammed Lasege – C, Louisville (sophomore)
  Tito Maddox – G, Fresno State (sophomore)
  Kei Madison – F, Okaloosa-Walton (sophomore)
  Roger Mason Jr. – G, Virginia (junior)
  Smush Parker – G, Fordham (sophomore)
  Travis Robinson – F, Jacksonville (junior)
  Kareem Rush – G, Missouri (junior)
  Jamal Sampson – F/C, California (freshman)
  Jerry Sanders – F, Northern Illinois (sophomore)
  Eddie Shelby – G, Dixie State (sophomore)
  Bobby Smith – G, Robert Morris (junior)
  Melvin Steward – G, Eastern New Mexico (junior)
  Marcus Taylor – G, Michigan State (sophomore)
  Terrell Taylor – G, Creighton (junior)
  Dajuan Wagner – G, Memphis (freshman)
  Adrian Walton – G, Fordham (freshman)
  Joseph Ward – F, Fort Hays State (junior)
  Omar Weaver – F/G, Riverside CC (freshman)
  Chris Wilcox – F, Maryland (sophomore)
  Troy Wiley – F, Rhode Island (junior)
  Frank Williams – G, Illinois (junior)
  George Williams – F, Houston (junior)
  Jay Williams – G, Duke (junior)
  Qyntel Woods – G/F, Northeast Mississippi CC (sophomore)

High school players
The following high school players successfully applied for early draft entrance.

  DeAngelo Collins – F, Inglewood High School (Inglewood, California)
  Lenny Cooke – G, Mott Adult High School (Flint, Michigan)
  Giedrius Rinkevicius – C, Bridgton Academy (Bridgton, Maine)
  Amar'e Stoudemire – F, Cypress Creek High School (Orlando, Florida)

International players
The following international players successfully applied for early draft entrance.

  Peter Fehse – F, Halle (Germany)
  Nenê Hilario – F, Vasco de Gama (Brazil)
  Nenad Krstic – Partizan (FR Yugoslavia)
  Mladen Šekularac – F, FMP (FR Yugoslavia)
  Nikoloz Tskitishvili – F, Benetton Treviso (Italy)

See also
 List of first overall NBA draft picks

References

Draft
National Basketball Association draft
NBA draft
NBA draft
2000s in Manhattan
Basketball in New York City
Sporting events in New York City
Sports in Manhattan
Madison Square Garden